George Holt may refer to:

George Holt (merchant) (1825–1896), Liverpool ship-owner, merchant and philanthropist
George Holt (cotton-broker) (1790–1861), British cotton-broker, merchant and philanthropist, father of the above
George Holt (actor) (1878–1944), American actor/director
George Chandler Holt (1843–1931), U.S. federal judge
George Holt (Medal of Honor) (1840–?), U.S. Navy sailor and Medal of Honor recipient
George Edmund Holt (1881–?), American journalist